Eugenia salamancana is a species of plant in the family Myrtaceae. It is endemic to Panama.

References

Endemic flora of Panama
salamancana
Data deficient plants
Taxonomy articles created by Polbot